Threatcon Delta is the debut studio album by American heavy metal vocalist Neil Turbin. The album was released in 2003 on Metal Mayhem Records, and contains twelve original tracks and two remakes. 25 different musicians appear on the album, including members of Dio, Rough Cutt, M.S.G. and Quiet Riot.

Threatcon Delta has been described as "true heavy metal" and "a definite throwback to the 80s thrash era" by some reviewers.

Track listing

Personnel
Neil Turbin – vocals
Jeff Scott Soto 
Ronnie Borchert 
Vern Anderson 
Sean McNabb 
Paul Monroe
Claude Schnell
Paul Shortino
Mitch Perry
Andy Walo
Henry Moreno
Sandy Vaquez

References

2003 debut albums